Allas Sak is the seventh album by the Swedish psychedelic rock group Dungen. The title loosely translates into English as "everyone's thing" or maybe "anyone's thing".

It was released as a CD and vinyl on 25 September 2015 through the Norwegian label Smalltown Supersound. The album was released in the US through Mexican Summer with a limited 1500-copy first pressing on red vinyl.

It was produced by Mattias Glavå and recorded in Kungsten Studios, Fashion Police Studios, In Kullhammar, Rösarne and Alstermo Airports by Mattias Glavå, Sven Johansson and Petter Winnberg

Track listing
Lyrics and music by Gustav Ejstes.
"Allas Sak" ("Everyone's Thing") - 3:29
"Sista Festen" ("The Last Feast") - 2:25
"Sista Gästen" ("The Last Guest") - 2:41
"Franks Kaktus" ("Frank's Cactus") - 5:40
"En Gång Om Året" ("Once a Year") - 4:32
"Åkt Dit" ("Gone There") - 3:01
"En Dag På Sjön" ("A Day on the Lake") - 4:14
"Flickor Och Pojkar" ("Girls and Boys") - 3:10
"Ljus In i Min Panna" ("Light Into My Head") - 3:57
"Sova" ("Sleep") - 8:34

Personnel 
Gustav Ejstes
Reine Fiske
Mattias Gustavsson
Johan Holmegard
Jonas Kullhammar – Saxophone, Clarinet

References

2015 albums
Dungen albums